Kilkerrin is a village in County Galway, Ireland. It is situated on the R364 regional road 6 km south of the town of Glenamaddy. Features in the area include Kiltullagh Lake and the Lough Lurgeen raised bog.

The local Gaelic Athletic Association club is Kilkerrin-Clonberne. The local soccer club is Kilkerrin United FC, who play in Division 1 of the Roscommon and District league.

People
Martin Breheny is from Kilkerrin.

See also
 List of towns and villages in Ireland

References

Towns and villages in County Galway